The Wild Swan is the third album by Northern Ireland singer-songwriter, Foy Vance. On this album, Foy Vance channels a wide variety of styles. The song "Upbeat Feelgood" was compared to Van Morrison by the Irish Times.  Elton John executive produced the album.

Track listing
Every track written by Foy Vance, except "Ziggy Looked Me in the Eye" written by Vance and Marc Bolan

Personnel
Adapted from AllMusic:

 Foy Vance – keyboards, guitar, mando-guitar, vocals
 Eric Darken – chimes, percussion, vibraphone
 Mike Farris – backing vocals
 Clare Hadwen – violin
 Richard Hadwen – viola
 Paul Hamilton – drums, percussion, backing vocals
 Leisa Hans – backing vocals
 Jim Hoke – piano, saxophone
 Alys Jackson – violin
 Tim Lauer – accordion, dulcimer, keyboards, harmonium
 Kolton Lee – baritone guitar
 Colm McClean – guitar, steel guitar, Mandocaster
 Conor McCreanor – bass guitar, double bass
 Blake Mills – slide guitar
 Darragh Murphy – low whistle, Uilleann pipes
 Ryan Rafferty – bagpipes
 Heather Rigdon – backing vocals
 David Sloan – cello
 Ashley Wilcoxson – backing vocals
 Jonathan Yudkin – fiddle, octophone, strings, backing vocals

References

2016 albums
Foy Vance albums
Albums produced by Jacquire King
Albums produced by Elton John
Gingerbread Man Records albums